Dominique Arribagé (born 11 May 1971 in Suresnes) is a French football manager and former player who most recently was the manager of Toulouse in Ligue 1.

Career
Arribagé played for Toulouse FC for ten seasons, appearing in 334 official matches making his the club's all-time leader.

References

External links 

2006–07 appearances on SoccerFactsUK 

1971 births
Living people
French footballers
Association football defenders
Toulouse FC players
Stade Rennais F.C. players
Ligue 1 players
Ligue 2 players
French football managers
Toulouse FC managers
Ligue 1 managers